Gordon Perry may refer to:

 Gordon Perry (producer) (born 1947), record producer
 Gordon Perry (Canadian football) (1903–2003), football player in the Canadian Football League
 Gordon Perry (wheelchair athlete), British wheelchair athlete